The Seattle Review is a leading literary journal founded in 1977 by Donna Gerstenberger  and Nelson Bentley. It is based at the University of Washington.  Work that has previously appeared in the journal has been short-listed for the Best American Short Stories and the Best American Essays on multiple occasions.

Notable past contributors include Sharon Olds, Daniel Orozco, Diane Wakoski, Al Young, Philip Heldrich, Carolyn Kizer, Marilyn Hacker, Mark Doty, Yusef Komunyakaa, Grace Paley, Denise Levertov, Tess Gallagher, Rebecca Aronson, and William Stafford.

See also
List of literary magazines

References

External links
 Seattle Review Homepage

1977 establishments in Washington (state)
Literary magazines published in the United States
Magazines established in 1977
Magazines published in Seattle
Quarterly magazines published in the United States
University of Washington